Glukharevo is a rural locality (a village) in Vasilyevskoye Rural Settlement, Vashkinsky District, Vologda Oblast, Russia. The population was 4 as of 2002.

Geography 
Glukharevo is located 12 km east of Lipin Bor (the district's administrative centre) by road. Shchukino is the nearest rural locality.

References 

Rural localities in Vashkinsky District